Lecanographa is a genus of about 40 species of lichens in the family Lecanographaceae. It was circumscribed in 1994 by José M. Egea and Pilar Torrente, with Lecanographa lyncea as the type species.

Species
Lecanographa abscondita 
Lecanographa amylacea 
Lecanographa atropunctata  – Southeast Asia
Lecanographa azurea  – Chile
Lecanographa brattiae 
Lecanographa dialeuca 
Lecanographa elegans 
Lecanographa imitans  – South America
Lecanographa insolita  – North America
Lecanographa lyncea 
Lecanographa martii 
Lecanographa microcarpella 
Lecanographa nothofagi 
Lecanographa rinodinae 
Lecanographa rosea  – Angola
Lecanographa rufa 
Lecanographa solicola 
Lecanographa subnothella 
Lecanographa uniseptata  – Gabon; Guatelama

References

Arthoniomycetes
Lichen genera
Taxa described in 1994
Arthoniomycetes genera